Gorenci is a village in the municipality of Centar Župa, North Macedonia.

Demographics
Gorenci has traditionally been inhabited by Orthodox Macedonians and a Muslim Macedonian (Torbeš) population of which both groups speak the Macedonian language.

According to the 2002 census, the village had a total of 267 inhabitants. Ethnic groups in the village include:

Turks 221
Macedonians 37
Albanians 9

References

Villages in Centar Župa Municipality
Macedonian Muslim villages
Turkish communities in North Macedonia